Tropical Storm Norman was a tropical cyclone that hit Mexico in September 2000. The sixteenth cyclone and fourteenth named storm of the 2000 Pacific hurricane season, Norman originated in a tropical wave that emerged from the coast of Africa on September 4, and moved westward across the Atlantic Ocean; the wave entered the Pacific on September 16. The disturbance organized into a tropical depression on early on September 20, and later that day the storm reached its peak intensity of 50 mph (85 km/h), and subsequently made landfall to the west of Lázaro Cárdenas, Michoacán. After weakening to a tropical depression over land, the storm re-emerged over open waters, and made a second landfall before dissipating shortly thereafter. The storm produced heavy rain that resulted in flooding and mudslides, killing about nine people.

Meteorological history

The origins of Tropical Storm Norman were from the same tropical wave that spawned Atlantic Hurricane Gordon, which emerged off the coast of Africa on September 4. The wave moved westward, with the southern portion of the wave crossing Central America while Gordon formed in the northwest Caribbean Sea. When the wave reached the eastern Pacific Ocean on September 16, it interacted with a pre-existing low-level circulation, which produced a large area of disturbed weather. On September 18, the convection began contracting and organizing, gradually developing a circular area of thunderstorms with well-defined outflow. It is estimated that at 0000 UTC on September 20, the system developed into Tropical Depression Sixteen-E, about 205 miles (335 km) south-southeast of Manzanillo, Colima.

Upon first becoming a tropical cyclone, the depression was located within an area of weak steering currents. Initially it was forecast to remain offshore; with warm waters and light wind shear, the depression was forecast to intensify into a strong tropical storm, and possibly attain hurricane status. However, the circulation was difficult to locate, and as such its exact motion was uncertain. Ships in the region confirmed the center of the storm as further northeast than previously thought, but also confirmed tropical storm force winds; as a result, the National Hurricane Center upgraded the depression to Tropical Storm Norman. Strengthening continued, and Norman attained peak winds of 50 mph (85 km/h), shortly prior to making landfall west of Lázaro Cárdenas, Michoacán, late on September 20.

Initially, the storm was forecast to dissipate quickly over land, although the possibility was noted for a westward turn, due to an anticyclone located over central Mexico. About 10 hours after moving ashore, Norman weakened to tropical depression status, and while moving further inland its track turned to the northwest. The center became very ill-defined over the mountainous terrain of southwest Mexico, although stronger rainbands persisted offshore. Late on September 21, the poorly defined center of Norman emerged into open waters near Puerto Vallarta, Jalisco, and subsequently turned northward. At first, the depression was forecast to re-intensify into a minimal tropical storm; however, its previous land interaction prevented it from ever re-strengthening. The circulation remained close to the coastline, and at 1500 UTC on September 22, Norman made landfall near Mazatlán, Sinaloa, as a weak tropical depression. Within a few hours, the cyclone dissipated over land.

Impact and preparations

In response to Norman's upgrade into a tropical storm, a tropical storm warning was issued for the coast from Zihuatanejo to Manzanillo on September 20. The warning was dropped after Norman made landfall the next day. No additional warnings were issued upon Norman's reemergence over water because it was never expected to restrengthen.

At La Villita, Michoacán, total rainfall reached . However, the highest amount was actually at Petacalco/La Union. The rainfall caused severe flooding and mudslides, which killed about nine people. Additionally, the heavy precipitation flooded streets and homes as well as down trees. Four of the deaths occurred in the State of Chiapas as a result of a mudslide. Two more were swept away by raging rivers in the State of Veracruz, and another two people drowned in the State of Guerrero. In Chiapas, authorities evacuated about 300 families due to the flooding.

See also
Other tropical cyclones named Norman

References

Eastern Pacific tropical storms
2000 Pacific hurricane season
Pacific hurricanes in Mexico
2000 in Mexico
Norman